Rhomphaiodon is an extinct genus of prehistoric sharks in the order Synechodontiformes that has been found in Late Triassic and Early Jurassic deposits located in Europe. The type species R. minor was originally named as a species of Hybodus in 1837 by Louis Agassiz. A second species, R. nicolensis, was added when the genus was named in 1993.

Fossil distribution 
Fossils of Rhomphaiodon have been found in:

Triassic
Grès de Mortinsart Formation, Norian-Rhaetian Belgium (R. minor)
Sables de Mortinsart Formation, Norian Belgium (R. minor)
near Saint-Laurent-du-Var, Rhaetian France (R. minor)
Gres à Avicula contorta Formation, Rhaetian France (R. nicolensis)
Apfelstädtgrundes, Rhaetian Germany (R. minor)
Kössener Schichten Formation (Cochloceras suessi ammonoid zone), Rhaetian Germany (R. minor)
Steinmergel Group, Norian Luxembourg (R. minor)
Magnesian Conglomerate, Rhaetian England (R. minor)
Westbury Formation, Rhaetian England (R. minor)
Microlestes Quarry, Frome, Rhaetian England (R. minor)
Manor Farm Quarry, Gloucestershire, Rhaetian England (R. minor)
Penarth Group, Rhaetian England (R. minor)
Cribbs Causeway, Bristol, Rhaetian England (R. minor)
Pullastra Sandstone, Rhaetian England (R. minor)

Jurassic
Aubange, Fleche (Hildoceras bifrons zone), Toarcian Belgium (R. minor)
Dudelange, Ginzebierg, Toarcian Luxembourg (R. minor)
Windsor Hill, Buckinghamshire (Lias Group?), Pliensbachian England (R. minor)

References 

Prehistoric sharks
Late Triassic Europe
Early Jurassic Europe
Synechodontiformes
Fossil taxa described in 1993